Vítor Hugo Brito Gazimba (born 1 October 1987) is a Portuguese football manager.

Moving to Norway after studying sports science, he was an assistant and academy manager in Strømsgodset for five seasons, and manager of Kongsvinger for one season. He became assistant manager of Örebro in 2020 and manager in 2021. After only four months as manager of the Allsvenskan club, he was sacked in October 2021. In June 2022 he was hired as assistant to Jens Gustafsson in Pogoń Szczecin.

References

1987 births
Living people
Portuguese football managers
Strømsgodset Toppfotball non-playing staff
Kongsvinger IL Toppfotball managers
Örebro SK managers
Allsvenskan managers
Portuguese expatriate football managers
Expatriate football managers in Norway
Portuguese expatriate sportspeople in Norway
Expatriate football managers in Sweden
Portuguese expatriate sportspeople in Sweden
Expatriate football managers in Poland
Portuguese expatriate sportspeople in Poland